Ramaprasad Banik (রমাপ্রসাদ বণিক) (1954–2010) was a Bengali theatre actor, director and playwright.  He also worked in films and televisions. He started his career at a very early age with Putul khela, which was an adaptation of Henrik Ibsen's A Doll's House. This play was directed by Sombhu Mitra. Banik was called protégé of the Sombhu Mitra. Banik wrote and acted in many plays for Bohurupee. In 1981 he left Bohurupee he created his own theatre group Chena Mukh. In 1991 he created another theatre group "Theatre Passion" He was a very prominent part of the Nehru Children's Museum theatre classes.

Career

Plays
With Bohurupee
Putul Khela
Dashachakra
Chhera Tar
Dashachakra
Chhar Addhaye
Jadi Arekbar

With Chena Mukh
Ranee Kahini
Icchegari
Aguntuk
Pakhi
Sharanagato

With Theatre Passion
Kabikatha
Trata
The Tempest
Dahanshil
Antar Bahir
Sparshak
Bhablai Bhalo
Anukul
Anko Sir, Golapi Babu ar Tipu
Iti Mritajan

With Nehru Children's Museum
Mahabidya Primary
Ekla Pagol
Manoniyo Shotyo
Jodio Sandhya
Anubhab
Sarashwati Samipeshu
Luxembourg er Laxmi
Bhalobasha
Parichoy

With Purba Paschim 
Angshumati
Patolbabu Film Star

With Anya Theatre
Ache Ache Sthan

With Taki Natyam
Good Morning Nishikanta

With IFTA
Ghasiram Kotwal

With Ajantrik
Pratham Path

Films
Chalo Patol Tuli (2011)
Aalo Chhaya (2011)
Bajikar (2011)
Ek Poloke Ektu Dekha (2011)
Purna Brahma Sri Sri Harichand (2011)
Juaari (2009)
Hochheta Ki? (2008)
Khalnayak (2006)
Sadhu Babar Lathi (2008)
Abar Asbo Phire (2004)
Rakhe Hari Mare Ke (2003) as Constable Ghoshal Babu
Amar Mayer Shapath (2003) as Nata Bose
Arjun Aamar Naam (2003)
Patalghar (2003)
Tumi Je Aamar (1994) as Avik Halder

Television soap operas
Janmabhumi
Draupadi
Kanakanjali
13 no. Barir Rahasya (as Hukakasi)
Mahaprabhu
Mohini
Bhanga garar khela
Aleya
banhishikha
Ek posla bristi
 Raja and Goja

References

External links

1954 births
2010 deaths
Place of birth missing
Bengali theatre personalities
Bengali actors